Dutkiewicz is a surname. Notable people with the surname include:

Adam Dutkiewicz (born 1977), American musician
Adriana Dutkiewicz, Australian sedimentologist
Edward Dutkiewicz (1961–2007), British artist
Michal Dutkiewicz (born 1955), American illustrator
Pamela Dutkiewicz (born 1991), German athlete
Rafał Dutkiewicz (born 1959), Polish politician
Wladyslaw Dutkiewicz (1918–1999), Polish-Australian artist and playwright

Polish-language surnames